W39CA-D, virtual channel 39 (UHF digital channel 24), is a low-powered, Class A independent television station licensed to Fulton, Mississippi, United States. The station is owned by the Unity Broadcasting Network.

History

The station first signed on in early 1995 as W38BX, channel 38. In its early years, to complement locally produced programming, W38BX carried programs from TBN. In 1997, the station changed its call letters (and channel position) to W39CD, channel 39. The station changed its call sign again on January 8, 2013, this time to W39CA. Upon being licensed for digital operation on May 28, 2015, the station changed its call sign to the current W39CA-D.

Today, W39CA-D is carried on cable systems in both Mississippi and Alabama.

W39CA-D broadcasts over the air, Comcast, MaxxSouth, and Metrocast.

Coverage areas
Fulton, Mississippi
Tremont, Mississippi
Smithville, Mississippi
Detroit, Alabama
Amory, Mississippi
Hatley, Mississippi
Nettleton, Mississippi
Gattman, Mississippi
Sulligent, Alabama
Hamilton, Alabama

References

External links
Unity Broadcasting Network Website

39CA-D
Television channels and stations established in 1995
Low-power television stations in the United States